The Colleen Bawn is a silent 1911 American romantic drama film based on the 1860 play of the same name. A secret marriage leads to murder. It and the play are based on the actual 1819 murder of 15-year-old Ellen Scanlan.

Prints of this film survive in the National Archives of Canada, and the George Eastman House Motion Picture Collection has one reel.

Cast

Production
The film was shot in Beaufort, County Kerry, Ireland, during the summer of 1911.

References

 Michel Derrien, Aux origines du cinéma irlandais: Sidney Olcott, le premier oeil, TIR 2013.  
 Denis Condon, Touristic Work and Pleasure: The Kalem Company in Killarney
 Denis Condon, Limelight on the Colleen Bawn: Resisting Autoexoticism in Provincial Irish Picture Houses in the Early 1910s

External links

Full restored film at YouTube
 The Colleen Bawn website dedicated to Sidney Olcott

American crime films
American romantic drama films
American silent short films
American black-and-white films
Crime films based on actual events
American films based on plays
Films directed by Sidney Olcott
Films set in Ireland
Films shot in Ireland
Kalem Company films
Romantic drama films based on actual events
1911 romantic drama films
1911 films
1910s American films
Silent romantic drama films
Silent American drama films